This is the discography of English singer, songwriter, and musician Declan McKenna. His debut studio album, What Do You Think About the Car?, was released in July 2017. The album peaked at number eleven on the UK Albums Chart. The album includes the singles "Brazil", "Paracetamol", "Bethlehem", "Isombard", "The Kids Don't Wanna Come Home", "Humongous", "Why Do You Feel So Down?", "Make Me Your Queen" and "Listen to Your Friends". His second studio album, Zeros, was released in September 2020. The album includes the singles "Beautiful Faces", "The Key to Life on Earth", "Daniel, You're Still a Child" and "Be an Astronaut".

Albums

Studio albums

Other albums

Extended plays

Singles

As lead artist

As featured artist

Guest appearances

Music videos

Notes

References

Discographies of British artists